The Changi Airport Skytrain is an automated people mover (APM) that connects Terminals 1, 2 and 3 at Singapore Changi Airport. Opened in 1990, it was the first driverless and automated system of its kind in South East Asia. The Changi Airport Skytrain operates from 05:00 to 02:30 daily. Traveling on the Skytrain is free and an inter-terminal journey takes approximately four minutes.

Since 2006, the trains operating on all Skytrain lines are Crystal Movers manufactured by Mitsubishi Heavy Industries. All stations are equipped with platform screen doors, are air-conditioned and have plasma displays indicating the arrival time of the next train.

With the opening of Changi Airport MRT station on 8 February 2002, the Skytrain is able to connect passengers at Terminal 1 to the MRT station entrances located at Terminals 2 and 3.

History 
In November 1990, alongside the opening of Changi Airport's second passenger terminal, the Skytrain began operations to connect the brand new Terminal 2 to the existing Terminal 1. It operated using the Adtranz C-100 and the ride lasted approximately 60 seconds.

On 17 March 2006, the rolling stock was replaced with the current Mitsubishi Crystal Mover System. Services were extended to the newly opened Terminal 3 and the South section opened in November 2007 with 5 new stations.

On 24 February 2015, services between Station B and E (Terminal 2 to 3 and vice versa) were suspended to make way for the construction of Jewel Changi Airport. The service was reopened to transit passengers on 12 April 2019, upon the opening of Jewel Changi Airport using a 3-car service. It was then fully reopened for the public and transit passengers in July 2019.

In April 2020, due to the COVID-19 pandemic drastically reducing passenger volumes, services from Station B to E (T2 to T3) and Station A to F (T2 to T3) were suspended for all passengers, as well as Station B to C (T3 to T1) and Station D to E (T1 to T2) services for transit passengers. All Skytrain services were then fully suspended on 1 May 2020.

On 27 July 2020, services from Station B to C (T3 to T1) were resumed for public passengers only.

On 17 November 2022, services from Station B to E (T3 to T2) were resumed for public passengers only.

System 
The Skytrain system consists of two independent systems: an airside-only PMS/South, which provides services between Terminals 2 and 3 and between Terminal 3 main building and South Pier, and a PMS/North that provides services between Terminals 1, 2 and 3 on both the landside and airside. The system use a bypass shuttle for services between Terminals 2 and 3 and single-lane shuttles for the rest of the system, with both the landside and airside having their own lanes.

The system consists of seven stations (A-South, A, B, C, D, E and F), each giving the name of the nearest boarding gate for easy recognition for passengers.

The Main Operation Control Center is located inside the maintenance office near A-South Station and the Standby Satellite Control Center is located in the center of the Terminal 3 building. Either of the control centers can be used to control the entire system.

Rolling stock

Adtranz C-100 
Initially, the Skytrain rolling stock consisted of Adtranz C-100s, jointly built by Westinghouse and Adtranz (acquired by Bombardier). Although stations were designed to accommodate two-car trains, the C-100 trains operated in single units, without a second carriage per train, and the two innermost platform screen doors of each station were for emergency purposes (the trains stopped at the outer half of each station, with two doors on each half).

Mitsubishi Heavy Industries Crystal Mover 

In 2002, work began on a new S$135 million Mitsubishi Crystal Mover-based system to accommodate the planned opening of Changi Airport Terminal 3 and the projected increase in demand as the airport expanded. During the upgrade, the existing C-100 system continued operations on one of the tracks while the other was upgraded from December 2004 to 16 March 2006, after which the latter resumed operations while the former was closed for upgrading. Full operations finally began in November 2007 when the lines serving Terminal 3 opened.

Overview 
Mitsubishi delivered 16 Crystal Mover vehicles to Singapore Changi Airport, ten of which are allocated to PMS/North and six to PMS/South. Five different designs with innovative external face images derived from the original Crystal Mover design were proposed to Changi Airport, with the final vehicle design being awarded the Good Design Award in 2006.

The Crystal Mover was also designed for flexible response to a variety of operations, from a one car operation to multiple coupled-car operations, depending upon the system requirements; this is seen in the use of dual-car operations for PMS/North landside and PMS/South, single-car operations for PMS/North airside and triple-car operations for T2-T3 services on PMS/North.

Exterior-wise, the Crystal Mover vehicles are painted in a base livery of silver and grey, blending in with the color scheme of the airport terminal buildings. However, many units are decorated with colorful promotional liveries. Trains come in two interior color schemes: blue for PMS/North trains, and orange for PMS/South trains.

All Crystal Mover vehicles have four wide-opening doors, two on each side. The interior features longitudinal seating at both ends of the car for a total of 8 seats, with a spacious standing area in the middle of the car for baggage and trolleys. At the ends of every car, an equipment housing offers a flat platform for additional seating. Trains were also fitted with two LED text displays located near the ceiling which display travel information, and two media screens displaying Airport promotional material.

Train formation 
The configuration of a Crystal Mover in revenue service is just the one car. With both the motors and the third rail current collectors, the train cars can be coupled up to 2 or 3 cars during service.

Signalling and operations 
In the Changi Airport Skytrain, the signaling system and the automatic operation system utilise a train detection system based on the check-in/check-out principle, an ATC and an overrun protection system (ORP) by on-board ATP. When a train enters the ORP signal aspect section, the on-board ATP device creates the ORP control pattern in a manner which protects the fixed-point stop control pattern by the on-board ATO. If the train speed overshoots the ORP control pattern, the emergency brake is activated, safely bringing the train to an emergency stop.

The system also uses a by-pass operation between Terminals 2 and 3, where trains are placed under synchronous control so that they depart and arrive at each corresponding station at the same time. Specifically, the station departing times are synchronized by the count of the station dwell time which is automatically adjusted based on the stoppage state at the station. Also, the train speed is adjusted by ATO which recognizes signals which are sent from the way-side control devices to the on-board control device at the time of departure from a station so that the crossing times in the bypass section are optimized and their arrival times are synchronized.

Redevelopment works 
In 2015, one portion of the Changi Airport Skytrain system connecting Station B and E was suspended due to construction works for Jewel Changi Airport. Passengers in the public area had to use the mezzanine level bridge along Changi Airport MRT station, and the Skytrain operating between Station A and F in the airside. Landside operations for services between stations A and F only resumed in July 2019.

Expansion 
To increase the system capacity of the Skytrain, six new train cars have been purchased which subsequently entered service in 2019. The existing shuttle between Terminals 2 and 3 was upgraded to a three-car system, whereas the shuttle between Terminal 3 and 3 South was upgraded to a two-car system.

Terminal 4, opened in 2017, is not served by the Skytrain. However, the future Terminal 5 will also have an underground automated people mover system.

References

External links 

 Changi Airport Skytrain, Land Transport Guru

Railway lines in Singapore
Changi Airport
Changi
Airport people mover systems
People mover systems in Singapore
Innovia people movers 
Crystal Mover people movers 
1990 establishments in Singapore
Railway lines opened in 1990